The Tejano Music Award for Entertainer of the Year is an honor presented annually by the Texas Talent Musicians Association (TTMA). The honor was presented to Tejano music musicians beginning at the 27th Tejano Music Awards after merging the Female Entertainer of the Year and Male Entertainer of the Year categories. The most awarded musician (and female) is Elida Reyna who received three wins, while Jay Perez and Jesse Turner have tied with most wins by a male (at two wins each).

Winners and nominees
Listed below are the winners of the award for each year, as well as the other nominees.

References

External links
Official site of the Tejano Music Awards

E
Awards established in 2007